Ottokar III (1124 – December 31, 1164) was Margrave of Styria from 1129 until 1164.

Biography 
He was the son of Leopold the Strong and Sophia of Bavaria, and father of Ottokar IV, the last of the dynasty of the Otakars. His wife was Kunigunde of Chamb-Vohburg.

From the Marburg line of the Counts of Sponheim, he inherited parts of Lower Styria between the Drave and Save rivers in what is today Slovenia. From his uncle, the last Count of Formbach, he inherited the County of Pitten in 1158, which is today in Lower Austria, but remained part of Styria until the 16th century. To improve connection to that territory, he improved the roads across the Semmering Pass, and he also erected a hospital in Spital am Semmering in 1160 as well as completing the colonization of the area around the Traisen and Gölsen rivers.

Ottokar exercised seigniorage over natural resources of his realm, extended territorial rule and minted his own coins. He also founded the Augustinian monastery of Vorau Abbey and founded and supported the Carthusian monastery of Seitz.

From the Second Crusade, he brought Byzantine craftsmen to Styria.

He was buried in his foundation at Seitz, but his body was later transferred to Rein Abbey in Styria.

External links 

1124 births
1164 deaths
Margraves of Styria
12th-century people of the Holy Roman Empire
Christians of the Second Crusade
Burials at Rein Abbey, Austria